Bourguibism ( al-Būrqībiyah) refers to the policies of Habib Bourguiba, the first President of Tunisia, and his followers. 

Bourguibism is defined by a strong commitment to national independence and specifically Tunisian nationalism (as opposed to pan-Maghrebi or pan-Arab ideas), a state capitalist approach on economic development, welfare state, a statist and corporatist interpretation of populism, strict secularism, and cultural modernity, advocating Tunisia's place as a bridge between Arab-Islamic and Western civilisation. Bourguibism is responsible for Tunisia's comparatively high divorce rates, which is one of the highest in the Arab and Islamic world, and relatively late age for women to get married (the average age for a woman is 35 years, which is much higher compared to most other Arab countries). Tunisian women are more sexually liberated, unlike their neighboring countries, and have a relatively strong role in economy, society and labour (all of which are comparable to the West). While Bourguibists condemned Tunisians who had collaborated with the French colonial rulers, they did not repress the strong European cultural influence on Tunisia and French continued to be the language of higher education and elite culture. Bourguibism is sometimes described as a variety of Kemalism but with focus on the Tunisian identity.

As a political style or strategy, Bourguibism is characterised by intransigence in pursuing certain goals and non-negotiable principles combined with flexibility in negotiations and readiness to compromise considering the means to effectuate them. It is therefore described as pragmatic, non-ideological, moderate, and reformist rather than revolutionary, but determined and relentless at the same time. For example, despite being decidedly secularist, Bourguiba made sure to curtail the public role of Islam only carefully and gradually, in order not to arouse opposition from conservative Muslims.

Political parties with Bourguibist platforms
Neo Destour/Socialist Destourian Party/Democratic Constitutional Rally (1934–2011)
National Destourian Initiative (2011–2019)
Al-Watan Party (2011–2013)
Nidaa Tounes (2012–)
Al Amal (2012–)
Free Destourian Party (2013–)
Machrouu Tounes (2016–)
Tahya Tounes (2019–)

Further reading

References

External links
Bourguiba's Jericho speech, 3 March 1965

Eponymous political ideologies
Politics of Tunisia
Secularism in Tunisia
Tunisian nationalism